The Kendalls Depot is a historic railroad station located on North Railroad Street in Kendall, Wisconsin. The station was built in 1900 for the Chicago & Northwestern Railway. The line was abandoned in 1964 and the former railbed was converted into the nation's first Rail Trail, opening in 1967.  Today, the depot serves as a trailhead for the famous Elroy-Sparta State Trail.

The depot was added to the National Register of Historic Places in 1981.

References

Railway stations on the National Register of Historic Places in Wisconsin
Railway stations in the United States opened in 1900
Former Chicago and North Western Railway stations
National Register of Historic Places in Monroe County, Wisconsin
Railway stations closed in 1963
Former railway stations in Wisconsin